The Mayor of the City of Zadar is the highest official of the Croatian city of Zadar. From 1990 to 2007 the mayor was elected by the city assembly. Since 2007 Croatian mayors are elected directly by the citizens. The first such election in Zadar occurred in 2009.

List 
Here follows a list of the 49 people who have thus far served as Mayors of Zadar starting in 1805:

French Empire

Austria-Hungary

Kingdom of Italy

Nazi Germany

Federal Yugoslavia 

Mayors in this period held title of President of the Assembly of the Municipality of Zadar.

Republic of Croatia

See also 
 Zadar
 Dalmatia
 Zadar County
 Elections in Croatia

References 

Zadar
Zadar